Chris Hackett (born August 3, 1993) is an American football safety who is currently a free agent. He played college football at TCU.

Early years
Hackett attended John Tyler High School in Tyler, Texas. He was rated by Rivals.com as a three-star recruit and ranked as the No. 38 safety in the nation in 2011. He committed to Texas Christian University (TCU) to play college football.

College career
Hackett attended TCU from 2011 to 2014. After redshirting in 2011, Hackett became a starter his redshirt freshman season. He remained a starter through his junior season.

After his junior season, Hackett entered the 2015 NFL Draft. He finished his career with 224 tackles and 12 interceptions.

Professional career

2015 NFL Combine

Tampa Bay Buccaneers
After going unselected in the 2015 NFL Draft, Hackett signed with the Tampa Bay Buccaneers as an undrafted free agent on May 5, 2015. On September 4, 2015, he was waived.

Oakland Raiders
On December 1, 2015, Hackett was signed to the Oakland Raiders' practice squad. On August 29, 2016, he was released by the Raiders.

References

External links
TCU Horned Frogs bio

1993 births
Living people
Sportspeople from Tyler, Texas
Players of American football from Texas
American football safeties
TCU Horned Frogs football players